Malá nad Hronom is a village and municipality in the Nové Zámky District in the Nitra Region of southwest Slovakia.

History
In historical records the village was first mentioned in 1523.

Geography
The village lies at an altitude of 125 meters and covers an area of 7.721 km².

Population
On 31 December 2011, it had a population of 392 people.

Facilities
The village has a public library, gas distribution network and a football pitch.

References

External links
Malá nad Hronom – Nové Zámky Okolie

Villages and municipalities in Nové Zámky District